The Battle of Fleurus, fought on 1 July 1690 near the town of Fleurus in modern Belgium, was a major engagement of the Nine Years' War. In a bold envelopment, Marshal Luxembourg, commanding a French army, inflicted a severe defeat on an Allied force led by Prince Waldeck. 

Despite this success, Louis XIV of France ordered Luxembourg to end his campaign in the Spanish Netherlands, and instead reinforce the Dauphin on the Rhine. The Allies withdrew to Brussels unconcerned by the defeat, since they were convinced their own losses could be replaced more quickly than those suffered by the French.

Background
In 1690 the main theatre of the Nine Years' War moved to the Spanish Netherlands. Command of French forces now passed to the talented Marshal Luxembourg (a position he would keep until his death in 1695), superseding Marshal Humières who had suffered defeat at the Battle of Walcourt the previous year. Luxembourg's army consisted of 34 battalions and 94 squadrons; if necessary he could call upon support from Marshal Boufflers’ forces on the Moselle.

Once again King William entrusted Allied forces in the region to Prince Waldeck (William was himself busy in Ireland forestalling King James' attempt to regain his throne). In other theatres Marshal de Lorge commanded French forces in the Rhineland, (although the Dauphin held honorific command). De Lorge was opposed by the Elector of Bavaria, who had succeeded command of Allied forces in the region after the death of Charles of Lorraine. Meanwhile, Marshal Catinat led the French forces in Dauphiné against the Duke of Savoy, whilst Marshal Noailles commanded forces deployed on the border of Catalonia.

Prelude
Prince Waldeck had hoped to delay the campaign to enable the Elector of Brandenburg to move on the Moselle and tie down Boufflers, but Luxembourg's early manoeuvres had allowed Boufflers to move between the rivers Sambre and Meuse to support the French commander. Waldeck, meanwhile, left his assembly point at Tienen (Tirlemont) and advanced to Wavre. After dispersing his troops to live off forage, the Allied army reassembled and advanced to Genappe on 8 June.

In mid-June Luxembourg split his forces. Humières was relegated to supervise the garrison of the Lines of the Lys and the Scheldt, whilst the main French army left Deinze and marched south, crossing the Sambre at Jeumont on 23 June. Meanwhile, detachments from Boufflers force under Rubantel had augmented Luxembourg's army, which continued its march, camping at Boussu on 27 June.

As Luxembourg manoeuvred south of Mons and Charleroi, Waldeck moved his camp between Nivelles and Pieton on 28 June. That same evening, Luxembourg personally led a detachment from Gerpinnes with pontoons to establish a bridge across the Sambre at Ham. A fortified position at Froidmont (garrisoned by about 100 men) was soon compelled to surrender after artillery was brought across the river; a simultaneous attack by French dragoons seized an enemy redoubt that had been abandoned at the approach of Luxembourg's army. With the bridgehead secure, the rest of the French army (apart from the heavy baggage that had remained on the south bank at Ham) crossed the Sambre on 30 June. (See map).

Waldeck decamped and moved towards the French bridgehead. French and Dutch cavalry sent out to reconnoitre the area crossed swords in an inconclusive action near Fleurus, but by evening the French cavalry had withdrawn to Velaine where it was joined by the rest of their army, only 3 km (< 2 miles) from the Allies.

Battle

On the morning of 1 July, Luxembourg marched his forces towards Fleurus. Waldeck had set up his 38,000 troops in the two customary lines on the high ground between the village of Heppignies on their right and past the chateau of St Amant on their left; Waldeck's front was covered by the Orme stream whose elevated banks made a frontal assault all but impossible. Luxembourg divided his forces to attack both flanks of the Allied army – an audacious plan that in order for it to succeed would require secrecy and deception. The columns of the first French line split to take position between Heppignies and Fleurus, with some troops moving up towards St Amant. The two columns of Luxembourg's right veered off to the north across the Orme, their passage covered by the hedges and wheat fields, and by a screen of French cavalry. Forty cannons were positioned near the chateau of St Amant, and another 30 guns positioned between the chateau and Fleurus.

Unnoticed by Waldeck, Luxembourg had enveloped his flanks. Had the Allied commander realised that Luxembourg had split his army in two, he might have overwhelmed the isolated French left before the right came into position, but he did not. After the French right wing was in position (commanded by Luxembourg himself), their artillery opened fire at about 10:00, striking the Allied infantry with great effect. The French left wing, commanded by Lieutenant-General Jean Christophe, comte de Gournay, opened their attack with a cavalry charge but Gournay was killed in the assault; his death and the salvos of the Dutch infantry disordered his cavalry who retired to Fleurus to regroup. 

A French cavalry charge on the right wing however, met with more success, driving the Dutch cavalry back. The French infantry followed and Waldecks forces now found themselves enveloped. On this critical moment Waldeck and Aylva ordered the Dutch infantry to form squares. This succeeded and the advancing French cavalry was forced to break of the assault. The French infantry, ordered to march straight onto the enemy, also failed to break the squares after suffering heavy casualties. Luxembourg, noticing the senselessness of further assaults decided to break the Dutch infantry by bombarding the thick squares from close range with captured artillery. To Luxembourgs surprise however did the artillery fire little to break Dutch morale, despite the very heavy casualties. One of Luxembourg adjutants, who could no longer stand to see the bloodshed, decided to talk the Dutch into capitulation. Luxembourg wrote after the battle to Louivois that "he told them that they were completely enveloped, that I (Luxembourg) was there and that I would spare them. They answered him: Leave, we want nothing, and are strong enough to defend ourselves."

What followed was a stubborn rearguard action. Waldeck and Aylva moved the troops in squares in the direction of Mellet and from there to Brussels, while the Dutch battalions in the rear formed an alternating front to the French. Under this covering fire the troops under Waldeck left the battlefield, despite various failed French attacks. The Dutch right flank under Henry Casimir II and the Prince of Nassau-Usingen sought refuge in the vicinity of the guns of Charleroi.

Aftermath

The Battle of Fleurus was a complete French victory, but devoid of result. Louvois, Louis’ war minister, wanted to order Luxembourg to immediately besiege Namur or Charleroi, but Louis, concerned about the dauphin's forces on the Rhine, ordered Luxembourg to detach part of his forces and forgo a major siege. Louvois objected, but King Louis wanted to be sure that nothing ‘disagreeable’ happened to his son's command. Nevertheless, Luxembourg was able to put much of the land east of Brussels under contribution.

Waldeck eventually retired on Brussels, where his injured troops were replaced with men from fortress garrisons. 15,000 Spanish troops under the Marquis of Gastañaga joined the main Allied army, as did the Count of Tilly with troops from Liège and Brandenburg on 22 July. On 2 August, the Elector of Brandenburg's forces combined with Waldeck, whose Allied army now numbered 70,000 men. With this force, the Allied army marched to Genappe, proceeding on to Nivelles on 7 August. After the battle, there was modest satisfaction in the Dutch Republic. The French had suffered more soldiers killed or wounded, according to the Dutch, and the French army was in no better shape than that of the Allies to continue the campaign.

The remainder of the campaign season in the Spanish Netherlands was relatively quiet. Boufflers temporarily combined his forces with Luxembourg, but in late August he returned to the area between the Sambre and Meuse rivers. After a series of minor skirmishes, both the Allies and the French returned to winter quarters in October; Luxembourg careful to station his men on enemy territory, while the Allies quartered in and around Maastricht. The Hanoverians returned home, while many from Brandenburg and Lüneburg found quarters in the fortresses of the Spanish Netherlands.

The French pressed the prisoners of war captured at Fleurus and previous occasions into their service. They sent the Germans to the army in Catalonia, the Walloons to Germany and the Dutch to Savoy. Many however escaped and made it back to Allied territories.

See also
 Trois Burettes

Notes

References
Childs, John. Warfare in the Seventeenth Century. Cassell, (2003). 
Dupuy, R. E & Dupuy, T. N. The Collins Encyclopaedia of Military History 4th ed. HarperCollins Publishers, (1995). 
Guizot, Francois P. G. A Popular History of France From The Earliest Times, Volume V. gutenberg.org
 Lynn, John A. The French wars 1667–1714: The Sun King at War. Osprey Publishing, (2002). 
 
Wolf, John B. Louis XIV. Panther Books, (1970). 
 
 
  

 

 

Battles of the Nine Years' War
Battles involving England
Fleurus
Battles involving the Dutch Republic
Battles involving the Spanish Netherlands
1690 in France
Conflicts in 1690
Battle